Arctostaphylos rudis, with the common names Shagbark manzanita and Sand mesa manzanita, is a species of manzanita.

Description 
This is an erect shrub growing from a burl to heights between one and two meters - 3 and 6 feet. Its stem and branches are covered in shredding gray and reddish bark, with its smaller branches coated in woolly fibers. The leaves are oval in shape and smooth along the edges with few hairs, green in color and shiny. They are 1 to 3 centimeters long. It flowers in late fall and winter in urn-shaped manzanita flowers. The fruits are hairless red drupes about a centimeter wide or slightly larger.

Distribution
Arctostaphylos rudis is endemic to California, where it is known only from the southern Central Coast. It is most abundant at Burton Mesa in the hills north of Lompoc, and there are a few occurrences remaining near Nipomo. It grows in chaparral and coastal sage scrub on sandy soils.

See also
California chaparral and woodlands
California coastal sage and chaparral ecoregion

References

External links
Jepson Manual Treatment of Arctostaphylos rudis
USDA Plants Profile for Arctostaphylos rudis
Arctostaphylos rudis — CalPhoto gallery
Oregon State University—Landscape Plants

rudis
Endemic flora of California
Natural history of the California chaparral and woodlands
Natural history of Santa Barbara County, California